is a railway station in Iwakuni, Yamaguchi, Yamaguchi Prefecture, Japan. It is operated by the Nishikigawa Railway, a third-sector railway company.

Lines
It is linked by a walkway to Shin-Iwakuni Station on the Sanyo Shinkansen approximately 300 m from this station.

Adjacent stations

History
With the privatization of JNR on 1 April 1987, control of the station passed to JR West which then ceded control to Nishikigawa Railway on 25 July 1987. On 16 March 2013, it was renamed Seiryū-Shin-Iwakuni Station to emphasize the connection with the nearby shinkansen station.

Passenger statistics
In fiscal 2011, the station was used by an average of 77 passengers daily.

References

Railway stations in Yamaguchi Prefecture
Railway stations in Japan opened in 1960